Regina Qu'Appelle Valley was a provincial electoral district for the Legislative Assembly of Saskatchewan, Canada. This district included the Regina neighbourhoods of  Fairways West, Lakeridge, Sherwood Estates and Lakewood. It also included the communities of Pense and Grand Coulee, Saskatchewan.

This riding was created for the 22nd Saskatchewan general election out of the former constituency of Qu'Appelle-Lumsden.

Members of the Legislative Assembly

Election results

|-

 
|NDP
|Steve Ryan
|align="right"|3,359
|align="right"|34.06
|align="right"|-6.54

|Independent
|Hafeez Chaudhuri
|align="right"|44
|align="right"|0.44
|align="right"|–
|- bgcolor="white"
!align="left" colspan=3|Total
!align="right"|9,862
!align="right"|100.00
!align="right"|

|-

 
|NDP
|Mark Wartman
|align="right"|4,158
|align="right"|40.60
|align="right"|-16.35

|- bgcolor="white"
!align="left" colspan=3|Total
!align="right"|10,242
!align="right"|100.00
!align="right"|

|-
 
| style="width: 130px" |NDP
|Mark Wartman
|align="right"|3,641
|align="right"|49.24
|align="right"|-5.95

|- bgcolor="white"
!align="left" colspan=3|Total
!align="right"|7,394
!align="right"|100.00
!align="right"|

|-
 
| style="width: 130px" |NDP
|Suzanne Murray
|align="right"|3,697
|align="right"|55.19
|align="right"|–

 
|Prog. Conservative
|Alice Miazga
|align="right"|378
|align="right"|5.64
|align="right"|–
|- bgcolor="white"
!align="left" colspan=3|Total
!align="right"|6,699
!align="right"|100.00
!align="right"|

External links 
Legislative Assembly of Saskatchewan
Elections Saskatchewan: Official Results of the 2007 Provincial Election By Electoral Division
Elections Saskatchewan - Official Results of the 2011 Provincial Election
Saskatchewan Archives Board – Saskatchewan Election Results By Electoral Division

Politics of Regina, Saskatchewan
Former provincial electoral districts of Saskatchewan